Vincent ter Schure (born 24 October 1979) is a visually impaired Dutch Paralympic cyclist.

Career
He represented the Netherlands at the 2016 Summer Paralympics held in Rio de Janeiro, Brazil together with his sighted pilot Timo Fransen and he won one gold medal and two silver medals. He won the gold medal in the men's road race B event and the silver medals in the men's road time trial B and men's individual pursuit B events.

At the 2017 UCI Para-cycling Road World Championships held in Pietermaritzburg, South Africa, he won the bronze medal in the men's 31 km time trial event.

At the 2019 UCI Para-cycling Track World Championships held in Apeldoorn, Netherlands, he won the silver medal in the individual pursuit B event.

He also represented the Netherlands at the 2020 Summer Paralympics held in Tokyo, Japan. He won two medals: the gold medal in the men's road race B event and the silver medal in the men's road time trial B event.

In 2022, he won a silver medal at the 2022 UCI Para-cycling Road World Championships held in 
Baie-Comeau, Canada and a bronze medal at the 2022 UCI Para-cycling Track World Championships held in Saint-Quentin-en-Yvelines, France.

References

External links 
 

Living people
1979 births
Sportspeople from Amersfoort
Cyclists at the 2016 Summer Paralympics
Cyclists at the 2020 Summer Paralympics
Medalists at the 2016 Summer Paralympics
Medalists at the 2020 Summer Paralympics
Paralympic gold medalists for the Netherlands
Paralympic silver medalists for the Netherlands
Paralympic medalists in cycling
Dutch male cyclists
Paralympic cyclists with a vision impairment
Paralympic cyclists of the Netherlands
Cyclists from Utrecht (province)
21st-century Dutch people
Dutch blind people